Bruniquel (Languedocien: Borniquèl) is a commune in the Tarn-et-Garonne department in the Occitanie region in southern France.

Geography
The river Vère flows northward through the commune, then flows into the Aveyron, which forms most of the commune's northern border.

Sights
The village is a picturesque mixture of old pink stone and red tile with a dramatic belfry, medieval gateways and defensive walls. Two feudal medieval castles dominate the village and the valley, one of which is the Château de Bruniquel.

The 'old' castle was built in the 12th century on the ruins of an earlier fortress said to have been founded by Queen Brunehaut in the 6th century and remained occupied until the 20th century. It was the home of William of Tudela who wrote the first part of La Chanson de la Croisade Albigeoise, an account of the Albigensian Crusade against the Cathars.

The 'young' castle was built in the 15th century and occupied for about 200 years. It now houses a museum of prehistory exhibiting "treasures of Bruniquel" found in several caves near the castles.

These caves include the Cave of Mayrières supérieure which contains ancient wall paintings that were damaged by overenthusiastic graffiti cleaners in 1991 and the Bruniquel Magdalenian abris, as well as the Bruniquel Cave that includes evidence of Neanderthal activity.

Miscellaneous
The commune's shield depicts a red chevron above a ram's head on a green ground.

Since 1997 the castles have been the venue of an annual arts festival celebrating the works of Jacques Offenbach.

The village, including the Château de Bruniquel, and its surroundings feature in the 1975 film Le Vieux Fusil (The Old Rifle) directed by Robert Enrico starring Romy Schneider and Philippe Noiret.

Transportation
There is a scheduled bus service to Montauban.

See also
 Communes of the Tarn-et-Garonne department

References

 Eugène Martin-Chabot (ed.), La Chanson de la Croisade Albigeoise, (Paris, 1989)

External links
 Bruniquel Tourism (in French)
 Picture of Mesolithic carving from Bruniquel cave
 Festival des Châteaux de Bruniquel site, for annual Offenbach festival

Communes of Tarn-et-Garonne
Plus Beaux Villages de France